Hilton College may refer to:

Hilton College (South Africa), a high school in South Africa
Hilton College of Hotel and Restaurant Management, an academic college of the University of Houston founded by Conrad Hilton